Gobryas (g-u-b-ru-u-v, reads as Gaub(a)ruva?; Elamite: Kambarma) was a common name of several Persian noblemen.

Gobryas (Cyrus the Great's general)
This Gobryas is mentioned in the Cyropedia of Xenophon as a general who helped in the conquering of Babylon.

The A.K. Grayson translation of the Nabonidus Chronicle, based on that of T.G. Pinches, considers both the names Ugbaru and Gubaru found in the latter to be references to this Gobryas. However the names are distinct in the text and refer to two different individuals, the one called Gubaru being the ruler placed over Babylon thus corresponding to Cyaxares of the Cyropedia, not Gobryas. Ugbaru remains a candidate for Gobryas being described as the ruler of the region of Gutium dying soon after the conquest of Babylon similarly to Xenophon's portrayal of Gobryas as an elderly "Assyrian" ruler.
According to William H. Shea Ugbaru and Gubaru is the same person, being the ruler placed over Babylon, dying soon after the conquest of Babylon.

Old Testament scholar Robert Dick Wilson argued that 'Darius the Mede' might be identified as Gobryas, drawing upon the work of Theophilus Pinches. George Frederick Wright championed the view of Wilson in his Scientific Confirmation of Old Testament History.

Gobryas (the lance-bearer of Darius the Great)

This Gobryas was one of the six helpers of Darius in killing Gaumāta in September 522 BC mentioned by Herodotus. He was appointed as Darius' lance carrier (arštibara). He is represented on the Behistun inscription and on Darius' tomb in Naqsh-e Rustam, as:
Gaubaruva \ Pâtišuvariš \ Dârayavahauš \ xšâyathiyahyâ \ arštbara
Gobryas from Pâtišuvariš, the lance carrier of king Darius.

Pâtišuvariš may be the mountainous region north of Alborz in northern Iran, probably Mazandaran. In 521 BC, he was sent to Elam to defeat the rebel king Atamaita; after this, he served as satrap of Elam.

Gobryas' family was closely entwined with the family of Darius the Great. Gobryas married the sister of Darius, known variously as Artazostre or Radušdukda. Their son Mardonius, was the Commander-in-Chief of the armies of Xerxes I in the Second Persian invasion of Greece, married Darius' daughter Artazostre. A daughter of Gobryas, from an earlier marriage, was married to Darius.

Gobryas (a philosopher and magus)
Another person with the name of Gobryas is a Persian magus and philosopher, who has been mentioned by Xanthus of Lydia. Gobryas is said to be in succession of Zoroaster, next to other philosophers like Ostanes, Sortes Astrampsychi, and Patizeithes.

References

T. Gaston, Historical Issues in the Book of Daniel, 2009

External links
Gobryas 1
Gobryas 2 
Gobryas 3

Year of death missing
Median people
Babylonian people
Satraps of the Achaemenid Empire
6th-century BC Iranian people
7th-century BC births
Defectors
Darius the Great